Hakan Yılmaz (born April 1, 1982 in Sivas, Turkey) is a European champion Turkish weightlifter competing in the –94 kg and 105 kg divisions. He acts also as a trainer in Eskişehir.

He competed for Turkey at the 2004 Summer Olympics, where he finished sixth in the men's 94 kg weightlifting event.

Achievements
Olympics

World Championships

European Weightlifting Championships

References

External links
 Hakan Yılmaz at Database Weightlifting
 
 
 

1982 births
Living people
Turkish male weightlifters
Olympic weightlifters of Turkey
Weightlifters at the 2004 Summer Olympics
World Weightlifting Championships medalists
European Weightlifting Championships medalists
European champions in weightlifting
European champions for Turkey
People from Sivas